John George Warwick (December 23, 1830August 14, 1892) was an American politician who served briefly as a U.S. Representative from Ohio from 1891 until his death in 1892

Biography
Born in County Tyrone on the island of Ireland (the entirety of which was then part of the U.K.), Warwick attended the common schools of his native land.
Warwick immigrated with his brother to the United States about 1850 and resided in Philadelphia, Pennsylvania, for a short time.
He moved to Navarre, Ohio, and became a bookkeeper in a dry-goods establishment, and later moved to Massillon, Ohio, and clerked in a dry-goods store, subsequently becoming interested in flour milling, coal mining, and agricultural pursuits. He also was a promoter of railroad construction.

Career
Warwick was elected as the 17th lieutenant governor of Ohio and served from 1884 to 1886.
He was an unsuccessful candidate for reelection in 1886. Warwick was elected as a Democrat to the Fifty-second Congress and served from March 4, 1891, until his death in Washington, D.C., August 14, 1892. He defeated William McKinley by 302 votes in an intensely fought race that gained national attention. McKinley was in favor of an import tariff on tinware. Warwick sent fake peddlers out into the rural 16th district who charged 50 cents for 25 cent tinware goods. When asked why the prices were so high, the peddlers replied: "This is the result of McKinley's tariff!".

Death
He died from food-poisoning at a meeting in New York City of the board of directors of a railroad on whose board he served.

He was interred in Protestant Cemetery, Massillon, Ohio.

See also
List of United States Congress members who died in office (1790–1899)

References

External links

1830 births
1892 deaths
People from County Tyrone
People from Massillon, Ohio
Lieutenant Governors of Ohio
Irish emigrants to the United States (before 1923)
19th-century American politicians
People from Navarre, Ohio
Democratic  Party members of the United States House of Representatives from Ohio